The Hydrocarbons Licensing Directive Regulations 1995 (SI 1995/1434) is a UK Statutory Instrument that implements the Hydrocarbons Directive 94/22/EC. It is relevant for UK enterprise law by determining the procedural steps that ought to be taken when a company is licensed to seek or extract oil and gas.

Contents
reg 3(1) ‘every application’ for a license has to be determined on (a) technical and financial capability of the applicant (b) the applicant's proposed methods (c) for tenders, the price (d) previous conduct if formerly a licensee under Petroleum (Production) Act 1934. The Minister can refuse an application even if there is no competition (2) ‘other relevant criteria’ can be applied if all else seems equal (4) the criteria cannot be used to discriminate. National security can be a ground. 
reg 4(1) the only terms in a license must but those to (a) ensure proper performance of activities in the licence (b) provide for payment for the grant of a licence (c) operational and other purposes in reg 4(2) 
reg 5, criteria must be put in the notice inviting applications by the Minister.

See also
UK enterprise law
UK energy law

Notes

United Kingdom enterprise law